The Metro E Line is a planned bus rapid transit route in Minneapolis, St. Paul, and Edina. The route will operate from Southdale Center Transit Center in Edina, Minnesota to Westgate station in St. Paul. Running mostly on France Avenue, Hennepin Avenue, and University Avenue, the line will serve major destinations such as Southdale Center, Fairview Hospital, 50th & France, Linden Hills, Uptown, Minneapolis Sculpture Garden, Downtown Minneapolis, Dinkytown, the University of Minnesota, and Prospect Park. The route will have "train-like" features to speed up service and improve reliability, such as signal priority, bus lanes, all-door boarding, further stop spacing, and specialized vehicles. In 2019 planning and design were underway, with construction slated for 2023 and operations beginning a year later but that timeline has been moved back. The E Line would largely replace Route 6 which carries 9,000 trips each weekday. The project was fully funded with $60 million by the state of Minnesota in 2021 and is expected to open in 2025.

Route 

The route was identified in Metro Transit's 2014 Arterial Transitway Corridors Study as one of twelve local routes to be upgraded to bus rapid transit. The study concluded that the busiest portion of Route 6, on Hennepin Avenue between downtown Minneapolis and Uptown, should be upgraded with an extension connecting it to West Lake station on the upcoming Southwest LRT. Since the release of the study, community members have expressed interest in having the upgrade cover more of the Route 6 corridor. In 2018 Metro Transit collected community feedback on 7 options south of Uptown and 3 options north of downtown Minneapolis.

Southern alignment 
Metro Transit proposed seven alternatives for a southern alignment south of Uptown.
Alternative 1 ended at 50th and France Ave via 44th Street.
Alternative 2 ended at 50th and France Avenue via 50th Street and Xerxes Avenue.
Alternative 3 ended at 50th and Xerxes Avenue.
Alternative 4 ended at Southdale via Xerxes Avenue, 50th Street, and France Avenue.
Alternative 5 ended at Southdale via France Avenue.
Alternative 6 ended at Southdale via Xerxes Ave.
Alternative 7 ended at West Lake station, same as the concept plan from the 2014 report.

Following feedback from the community, Metro Transit decided Alternative 4, 5, and 6 would advance for additional consideration and study.

Ultimately Alternative 5 was selected as the preferred alignment and was presented to the Metropolitan Council September 23, 2019, to be adopted as the recommended alignment. Reasons for choosing France Avenue over Xerxes was the ability to serve commercial nodes at 44th & France and 50th & France, and direct access to the Fairview Hospital campus.

Central alignment 
From the start of the project it was known that the E Line would travel along Hennepin Avenue from Washington Avenue downtown to Uptown Transit Station. At the time of the Arterial Transitway Corridors Study, Route 6 buses were only in motion 39% of the time between Uptown Transit Station and 7th Street downtown. Average speeds were sometimes just 6 miles per hour. From Uptown Transit Center to Franklin Avenue during morning rush hours, buses carried 49% of people traveling in the corridor while only making up 3% of vehicles. During the evening rush hours, buses carried 45% of people traveling in the corridor and only 2% of vehicles. To help speed up service and improve reliability, the City of Minneapolis and Metro Transit partnered for a bus lane pilot on Hennepin Avenue between Franklin and Uptown in May 2018. The pilot removed on-street parking south of 26th Avenue for southbound buses and on-street parking north of 26th Avenue for northbound buses. There was a three-day test from May 15 to 17 to gather public feedback and better understand bus lanes.

After the pilot concluded, the bus lanes were removed and on-street parking was restored. The pilot received positive feedback, but neither the City of Minneapolis or Metro Transit had near-term plans to permanently implement bus lanes in the corridor. On September 7, 2019, painted bus lanes were permanently installed on Hennepin between Franklin Avenue and Lake Street, the first painted bus lanes in Minnesota. The same day painted bus lanes were also installed on Chicago Avenue, which operates the busiest bus route on the system, Route 5, and is planned for the METRO D Line. The improvement resulted in more consistent travel times and a reduction of travel times by 12 percent.

In downtown Minneapolis enhanced stations are being constructed with the Hennepin Avenue reconstruction project. The approved project layout, currently under construction, includes four rapid bus stations at Hennepin & 3rd/4th Streets, 5th Street, 7th/8th Streets, and 10th/11th Streets.

Northern alignment 
Metro Transit proposed three alternatives north of Washington Avenue in downtown Minneapolis. The first option had the route end near Washington Avenue in downtown. The second option took the route over the Mississippi River into Nicollet Island/East Bank before taking the University Avenue/4th Street pair into Southeast Minneapolis. The route would pass through the Marcy-Holmes neighborhood and Dinkytown, serving a large student population. The route would run along the northern edge of the University of Minnesota campus before terminating at Stadium Village station. The third option was identical to the second, but with an extension along University Avenue to Westgate station in St. Paul.

The option into Southeast Minneapolis was selected as the preferred alignment, with the final terminus to be decided during the engineering phase in 2020.

Stations

See also 
Metro A Line
Metro B Line
Metro C Line
Metro D Line
Metro Purple Line
Metro Gold Line

References

External links 

Interactive Corridor Map
E Line Project Website

Bus rapid transit in Minnesota
Proposed bus rapid transit in the United States
Proposed public transportation in Minnesota
Metro Transit (Minnesota)